Methylobacterium adhaesivum  is a Gram-negative, methylotrophic, non-spore-forming strictly aerobic and motile bacteria from the genus of Methylobacterium which has been isolated from drinking water in Seville in Spain.

References

Further reading

External links 
Type strain of Methylobacterium adhaesivum at BacDive -  the Bacterial Diversity Metadatabase

Hyphomicrobiales
Bacteria described in 2006